Loensia moesta is a species of common barklouse in the family Psocidae. It is found in North America.

References

External links

 

Psocidae
Articles created by Qbugbot
Insects described in 1861